The 2018 United States Senate election in Tennessee took place on November 6, 2018, concurrently with other elections to the United States Senate, elections to the United States House of Representatives and various state and local elections. Incumbent Republican Senator Bob Corker opted to retire instead of running for a third term. Republican U.S. Representative Marsha Blackburn won the open seat, defeating former Democratic Governor Phil Bredesen.

Early in the campaign, Bob Corker said that Blackburn's opponent, Democrat Phil Bredesen, was "a very good mayor, a very good governor, a very good businessperson", that he had "real appeal" and "crossover appeal", and that the two of them had cooperated well over the years. But Corker said he would vote for Blackburn and donate to her campaign, and questioned whether Bredesen would be able to win a Senate seat in a red state like Tennessee. After Corker's praise for Bredesen, Senate Majority Leader Mitch McConnell warned Corker that such comments could cost the Republican Party its Senate majority. Shortly after Corker's comments, President Trump tweeted an endorsement of Blackburn.

In October 2018, singer-songwriter Taylor Swift endorsed Bredesen. The endorsement was notable given that Swift had been publicly apolitical, but spoke out because Blackburn's voting record in Congress "appalled" and "terrified" her. Swift shared a link to the nonpartisan voter registration website Vote.org, which saw a significant spike in page views and new registrations. Trump criticized Swift's endorsement.

This election was expected to be among the most competitive Senate races in 2018, with CNN calling it the single most important Senate race in the country. Polls showed the race as close until the confirmation hearings for Supreme Court Justice Brett Kavanaugh started, which many Tennesseans believed the Democratic Party handled poorly. This is believed to have mobilized Republican voters and cost Bredesen any chance of winning. Bredesen also announced his support for Kavanaugh, which some believe cost him supporters.

On election day, Blackburn defeated Bredesen. This was Tennessee's closest Senate race since 2006, with Blackburn winning by a 10.8% margin. The primaries took place on August 2, 2018, with Blackburn and Bredesen winning their respective party nominations.

Republican primary

Candidates

Nominee
 Marsha Blackburn, U.S. Representative

Eliminated in primary
 Aaron Pettigrew, truck driver

Withdrawn
 Bob Corker, incumbent U.S. Senator
 Rolando Toyos, ophthalmologist and candidate for the Shelby County Commission in 2010
 Larry Crim, perennial candidate
 Andy Ogles, former director of the Tennessee chapter of Americans for Prosperity
 Stephen Fincher, former U.S. Representative

Declined
 Mae Beavers, former state senator (formerly ran for Governor)
 Diane Black, U.S. Representative (unsuccessfully ran for Governor)
 Randy Boyd, former commissioner of the Department of Economic and Community Development (unsuccessfully ran for Governor)
 Tim Burchett, Knox County Mayor (running for TN-02)
 Joe Carr, former state representative, candidate for U.S. Senate in 2014 and candidate for TN-06 in 2016
 Chuck Fleischmann, U.S. Representative (running for reelection)
 Mark Green, state senator (running for TN-07)
 Beth Harwell, Speaker of the Tennessee House of Representatives (unsuccessfully ran for Governor)
 Bill Haslam, Governor of Tennessee
 David Kustoff, U.S. Representative (running for reelection)
 Bill Lee, businessman (ran for Governor)
 Peyton Manning, retired football player
 Randy McNally, Lieutenant Governor of Tennessee
 Ron Ramsey, former lieutenant governor and candidate for governor in 2010

Speculation surrounding Senator Corker
On September 26, 2017, Republican Senator Bob Corker announced that he would not seek another term in 2018. Without Corker running, it was widely believed that the Republican Party would have a much harder time keeping the seat. Many called on Corker to reverse his decision to retire. Former U.S. Representative Fincher dropped out of the race, calling on Corker to jump back in and challenge U.S. Representative Blackburn for the GOP nomination. Fincher said in a statement that the GOP should unite "behind a candidate who can win" the general election. Blackburn said she would remain in the race even if Corker reversed his decision. Amid the speculation about Corker's decision, many of Tennessee's Republican politicians, including many in the Tennessee General Assembly, reiterated their support for Blackburn. Corker's chief of staff announced on February 27, 2018, that Corker would stick with his plan to retire.

Endorsements

Polling

Results

Democratic primary

Candidates

Nominee
 Phil Bredesen, former Governor of Tennessee and former Mayor of Nashville

Eliminated in primary
 Gary Davis
 John Wolfe Jr. attorney and perennial candidate

Withdrawn
 James Mackler, attorney and veteran
 Bill Bailey, teaching assistant and retired UPS trailer mechanic

Declined
Andy Berke, Mayor of Chattanooga
Megan Barry, former Mayor of Nashville
 Jim Cooper, U.S. Representative and nominee for U.S. Senate in 1994
 Karl Dean, former Mayor of Nashville (running for Governor)
 Craig Fitzhugh, Minority Leader of the Tennessee House of Representatives (unsuccessfully ran for Governor)
 Bill Freeman, businessman and candidate for Mayor of Nashville in 2015
 Lee Harris, Minority Leader of the Tennessee Senate
 Jeff Yarbro, state senator
 Raumesh Akbari, state representative
 John Ray Clemmons, state representative
 Tim McGraw, country musician, songwriter and actor

Results

Independents
 Dean Hill, US Army Veteran, Ex-Government, Business Owner, Realtor

General election

Predictions

Debates
Complete video of debate, September 25, 2018
Complete video of debate, October 10, 2018

Endorsements

Fundraising

Polling

with generic Republican and generic Democrat

with Bob Corker

with Stephen Fincher

with Clay Travis

with Bob Corker and generic Democrat
{| class="wikitable"
|- valign=bottom
! Poll source
! Date(s)administered
! Samplesize
! Marginof error
! style="width:100px;"| BobCorker (R)
! style="width:100px;"| GenericDemocrat
! Undecided
|-
| Public Policy Polling (D-Our Lives on the Line)
| align=center| August 11–13, 2017
| align=center| 663
| align=center| ± 3.6%
|  align=center| 47%
| align=center| 37%
| align=center| 16%

with Peyton Manning

Results
On November 6, 2018, Blackburn defeated Bredesen in the general election, carrying all but three counties, the largest number of counties ever won in an open senate election in Tennessee. Although polls began to show the race in Blackburn's favor following the Kavanaugh hearings, Blackburn won by a larger margin than all but one poll showed.

See also
 Elections in Tennessee
 Political party strength in Tennessee
 Tennessee Democratic Party
 Tennessee Republican Party
 Government of Tennessee
 2018 United States House of Representatives elections in Tennessee
 2018 United States Senate elections
 2018 United States elections

Notes

References

External links
Candidates at Vote Smart
Candidates at Ballotpedia
Campaign finance at FEC
Campaign finance at OpenSecrets

Official campaign websites
Marsha Blackburn (R) for Senate
Phil Bredesen (D) for Senate
Kris L. Todd (I) for Senate

2018
Tennessee
2018 Tennessee elections